Moneglia is a comune (municipality) in the Metropolitan City of Genoa in the Italian region Liguria, located about  southeast of Genoa. It is a tourist resort on the Riviera di Levante. In 2012 it was added to the list of I Borghi più belli d'Italia.

Geography

Topography

The village is located inside a large bay bounded by two capes, both rich in Mediterranean vegetation: Punta Moneglia in the west and Punta Rospo in the east. While the first is completely wild and accessible only by trail, the second has several residential areas to the village of Lemeglio.

The municipality includes, in addition to the main village, the frazioni of Bracco, Casale, Camposoprano, Comeglio, Crova, Facciù, Lemeglio, Littorno, San Lorenzo, San Saturnino and Tessi.

It is bordered to the north by the municipality of Castiglione Chiavarese, to the south is washed by the Ligurian sea, to the west by the municipality of Casarza Ligure and Sestri Levante and to the east by municipality of Deiva Marina, in the province of La Spezia.

Climate
Moneglia has a Mediterranean climate. The Climatic Classification is "zone D, 1547 GR/G". The summers are quite hot during the day and fresh in the night. The winters are usually quite warm and the temperature rarely goes below zero.

Main sights
Church of San Giorgio, built in 1396 by Benedictine monks, who were replaced by Franciscans in 1494. The interior houses a wooden sculpture by Anton Maria Maragliano, a canvas of St. George Killing the Dragon attributed to Peter Paul Rubens, a Madonna with Saints by Carlo Dolci and an Adoration of the Magi by Luca Cambiaso. It has also a  cloister.
Church of Santa Croce, built, according to some sources, in 1130, but probably pre-existing. The modern church, in Baroque style, dates to 1725, and houses a statue of Madonna by Maragliano and a Byzantine Crucifix.
Oratory of the Disciplinanti, known from the 10th century. It houses frescoes of stories of the Madonna and Jesus.
Villafranca Tower, built by the Republic of Genoa around 1130, but later rebuilt during the struggle between the Genoese and the Malaspina family.
Monleone Fortress, constructed in 1173 by the Genoese. In 1174 it was besieged by Count Obizzo Malaspina. It houses now an Art Nouveau-style residence, dating to the early 20th century.

Economy

Tourism
The most important economic resource is tourism. It has wide sandy beaches, many rocky beaches and a large number of small bays accessible only by sea. There  are numerous  nature trails in the hills around the town. The rocky coast is also home of several a climbing wall systems.

History

The village, already inhabited in pre-Roman times by Ligurians, became an important centre during the Roman Age thanks to its strategic position on Via Aurelia. In the 7th century AD Liguria was conquered by king Rothari and then by the Lombard king Liutprand who favoured the spread of the monasteries. Charlemagne gave the land and the port to the Monks Columban. In the Middle Ages Moneglia, along with other villages of eastern Liguria, was invaded by Saracen pirates who sacked it. The fief of Moneglia was ruled, until 1153, by the Fieschi from Lavagna, and subsequently  became part  of the Republic of Genoa. In 1284 Moneglia participated with its ships at the victorious Battle of Meloria, where Genoa won against the Republic of Pisa. According to the tradition Genoa donated to the community of Moneglia some pieces of the port of Pisa chain in exchange for their contribution to the victory. In the 16th century Moneglia was elected by Genoa as capital of the surrounding area. In 1815 Moneglia was incorporated in the Kingdom of Sardinia, after the Congress of Vienna; in 1861 it became part of the Kingdom of Italy.

Culture

Cuisine
The main product of this land is Ligurian olive oil, which has obtained in recent years the PDO "Riviera Ligure di Levante".
The cultivation of olive trees has allowed, over the past decades, the emergence of several mills where the production, especially a family, is now widespread.
Moneglia oil goes well with fish dishes and Mediterranean diet, of which the Ligurian cuisine is perhaps the ultimate expression.

People
 Nicolò Caveri (also Canerio) who draw in 1502 a map of the "New world", discovered 10 years before by Christopher Columbus: the map is now held at Musee hydrographique de la Marine in Paris.
 Sandro Giacobbe (1951), Italian singer.
 Luca Cambiaso (1527–1585), artist.
 Giuseppe Domenico Botto (1791–1865), physicist.
 Gerolamo Bollo (1866–1931), admiral of the Italian Navy.
 On 29 September 2002 Gianluca Genoni, Italian diver, obtained in the waters of Moneglia the world record ( below sea level) in variable weight.

Main events
 "Carnevale della zucca", in February, a parade of carnival floats.
 Olive oil festival, on the Easter Monday.
 "Santa Croce" festival in the Santa Croce church.

Transports

Roads
The village center of Moneglia is crossed by the main coastal road that allows the connection to the west with Sestri Levante via Riva Trigoso and to the east with Deiva Marina, in the province of La Spezia.
The nearest motorway junctions are Sestri Levante and Deiva Marina on the Autostrada A12.

Further links are the provincial roads n° 55 "of Moneglia" and n° 68 "del Facciù", which are connected, on the hills behind the village, both to the north with the SS1 Aurelia.

National rail
Moneglia has a railway station on the railway line Genoa-La Spezia-Pisa. Convenient connections with Milan, Genoa, La Spezia, Cinque Terre and the others villages of Ligurian riviera.

Twin towns 
Moneglia is twinned with:

  Engen, Germany, since 2009

References

External links
 Official website

Cities and towns in Liguria